Polarornis is a genus of prehistoric bird, possibly an anserimorph. It contains a single species Polarornis gregorii, known from incomplete remains of one individual found on Seymour Island, Antarctica, in rocks which are dated to the Late Cretaceous (López de Bertodano Formation, about 66 Ma).

The discovery of Polarornis gregorii was first announced by Sankar Chatterjee in 1989, but he did not describe and officially name the species until 2002. The name Polarornis had been announced unofficially several years prior to its official publication, in Chatterjee's 1997 book The Rise of Birds.

Classification 
The relationships of this species are unclear. It is often claimed to be an ancestor of modern loons (divers), but some scientists have questioned this. Gerald Mayr, for example, noted that Polarornis differed from loons in some important characteristics, and criticized Chatterjee's original description of the fossils for overstating the specimen's completeness. Before the official description of the species, Alan Feduccia published an opinions casting doubt on its identification as a loon. However, other Mesozoic bird specialists, including Storrs Olson and Sylvia Hope, have supported the classification of Polarornis as an early member of the loon lineage.

Some recent studies seem to vindicate its status as a stem-loon; alongside Neogaeornis and some unnamed Antarctic specimens, it seems to suggest a Gondwanan origin for this clade, possibly displaced northwards by early penguins. However, in 2017, a phylogenetic study, Agnolín and colleagues have found Neogaeornis and Polarornis to be stem-anseriforms along with Australornis and Vegavis in the family Vegaviidae.

Paleobiology 
Polarornis was in all likelihood aquatic and fed on fish and large invertebrates, probably being an ecological equivalent of loons, grebes, or the Cretaceous Hesperornithes of the Northern Hemisphere. One analysis of the structure of the femur (TTU P 9265) showed that the bones were dense, rather than hollow and lightweight as in flying birds, suggesting that Polarornis was a flightless or near-flightless diving bird similar to hesperornithines and penguins.

See also 

 Geology of Antarctica
 List of fossiliferous stratigraphic units in Antarctica
 South Polar region of the Cretaceous

References

Further reading 
  
 Olson, Storrs L. (1985): The fossil record of birds. In: Farner, D.S.; King, J.R. & Parkes, Kenneth C. (eds.): Avian Biology 8: 79-238. Academic Press, New York.

Prehistoric bird genera
Extinct flightless birds
Late Cretaceous birds
Cretaceous birds of Antarctica
Fossils of Antarctica
Fossil taxa described in 2002